Subhi Bey Barakat al-Khalidi or Suphi Bereket (1889, Antakya – 1939, Turkey) was a Turkish politician from Antakya. During the French Mandate of Syria, he was the president of the Syrian Federation from 29 June 1922 (the day following its creation) to 1 January 1925 and of the State of Syria from 1 January 1925 to 21 December 1925. Also, between 1938 and 1939, he served as the Antakya deputy of the Republic of Hatay and was elected to the Internal Affairs Committee.

Part of the reason the French supported his candidacy as president of the Syrian Federation was because as neither a native of Damascus nor a very strong Arabic speaker (Turkish was his mother tongue), he did not seem to pose a nationalist threat to French rule.

Initially, he was a partner of Ibrahim Hanano in his revolt. He played a major role in merging the States of Aleppo and Damascus into one state, and he quit the presidency of Syria in 1925 in protest to the French position regarding the fate of the Alawite and Druze States, which France refused to add to Syria because it feared that might endanger the independence of the newly created Lebanon.

Personal life
Barakat was married to Halide; They had three sons (named Rıfat, Halit, and Selahattin) and three daughters (Süheyla Mukbile, Zehra, and Saniye). Süheyla Mukbile married Refik Koraltan's son Oğuzhan Koraltan. Zehra married Turkish diplomat Vahit Melih Halefoğlu. Saniye married to businessman Fazıl Tüzemen.

See also
Mandate for Syria and Lebanon
Hatay State

References

Turks from the Ottoman Empire
History of Hatay Province
Deputies of Hatay
Syrian people of Turkish descent
Presidents of Syria
1889 births
1939 deaths
20th-century Syrian politicians
Syrian politicians